16 to Life is a comedy film directed by Becky Smith and starring Hallee Hirsh as Kate, a bookish teen about to turn 16 who plays match-maker for her friends. Co-stars include: Shiloh Fernandez, Mandy Musgrave, Theresa Russell, Carson Kressley and Nicholas Downs. The film was originally titled “Duck Farm No. 13”, but the title was changed to appeal to younger audiences; it was filmed primarily in McGregor, Iowa and premiered August 29, 2009 at the Landlocked Film Festival.

Premise
An omniscient narrator begins the film only to have the main character, Kate, interrupt him to add her point of view.  This introduction sets the scene as we watch Kate arrive at the riverside malt shoppe, Float-on-Inn.  She arrives  early to read a book about the cultural revolution in China. Not your typical 16-year-old.

Kate demonstrates her maturity and care by helping her co-workers navigate their dreams, horoscopes, and moral dilemmas.  At the same time, she has her own moral dilemma to navigate.  Today is Kate's birthday.  She's 16 and never been kissed.

References

External links
 
 

American comedy films
2009 comedy films
2009 films
Films set in Iowa
2000s English-language films
2000s American films